Limón is a canton in the Limón province of Costa Rica. The head city is in Limón district.

Toponymy
Limón is the word in Spanish for the lemon fruit.

History 
Limón was created as a canton on 25 July 1892 by decree 61.

A district of Limón was established in 1870 under the jurisdiction of the central government in San José.

Geography 
Limón has an area of  km² and a mean elevation of  metres.

The canton lies along the Caribbean coast from the mouth of the Toro River in the north to Tuba Creek in the south. It ranges westward into the Cordillera de Tilarán, with a southwest finger of the canton reaching up to the peak of Cerro Chirripó, the highest point in Costa Rica.

Districts 
The canton of Limón is subdivided into the following districts:
 Limón
 Valle La Estrella
 Río Blanco
 Matama

Demographics 

For the 2011 census, Limón had a population of  inhabitants.

Transportation

Road transportation 
The canton is covered by the following road routes:

References 

Cantons of Limón Province
Populated places in Limón Province